Operation Fiery Vigil was the Noncombatant Evacuation Operation (NEO) emergency evacuation of all non-essential military and U.S. Department of Defense civilian personnel and their dependents from Clark Air Base and U.S. Naval Base Subic Bay during the June 1991 eruption of Mount Pinatubo in the Republic of the Philippines.

This non-combat operation resulted in the transfer of roughly 20,000 people from Clark Air Base and U.S. Naval Base Subic Bay back to contiguous United States, by way of Cebu, Philippines. The commanding general, 13th USAF, was in command of the joint task force.

Timeline 
16 July 1990 A 7.8  earthquake strikes the island of Luzon, Philippines. This earthquake caused a landslide, some local tremors, and a brief increase in steam emissions from a preexisting geothermal area at Mount Pinatubo.
March–June 1991 Magma rising toward the surface from more than  beneath Mount Pinatubo triggered small earthquakes and caused powerful steam explosions that blasted three craters on the north flank of the volcano. Thousands of small earthquakes occurred beneath Pinatubo, and many thousands of tons of sulfur dioxide gas were emitted by the volcano.

10 June 1991 after receiving final authorization from the Secretary of Defense, all non-essential military and Department of Defense civilian personnel and their dependents initiated land evacuation from Clark Air Base at 0600 local time. This land evacuation brought an estimated 15,000 personnel and several thousand vehicles onto U.S. Naval Base Subic Bay.
These eruptions were accompanied by nearly continuous seismic activity and expulsion of huge quantities of ash, tephra, and volcanic bombs.
15 June 1991 Major eruption of Mount Pinatubo, sending ash and tephra over  into the air. Clark Air Base and Subic Bay Naval Station, the two largest U.S. military bases in the Philippines, were heavily damaged by ash from this volcanic eruption. Nearly one foot of ash sodden by rain from Typhoon Yunya (1991) accumulated on both Clark Air Base and U.S. Naval Base Subic Bay. Many buildings collapsed under the weight of the accumulated ash, and all flight operations were suspended at both bases for many days or even weeks afterwards.

Aftermath 

The 1991 Ultra-Plinian eruption of Mount Pinatubo was the second largest terrestrial eruption of the 20th century (surpassed only by the 1912 eruption of Novarupta), and the largest eruption in living memory. The eruption produced high-speed pyroclastic flows, giant lahars, and a cloud of volcanic ash hundreds of miles across.

Very few of the estimated 20,000 who left the base ever returned. The vast majority were evacuated to Andersen Air Force Base, Guam and processed for return to the continental United States.

22 June 1991 A team of 11 engineers and utility systems specialists from Headquarters Pacific Air Forces and the 554th Rapid Engineer Deployable Heavy Operational Repair Squadron Engineers arrives at Clark Air Base to assess the damage caused by Mount Pinatubo to determine the fate of the base.
12 July 1991 U.S. Secretary of the Air Force announces U.S. Air Force will leave the Philippines no later than 16 September 1992.
5 November 1991 Secretary of the Air Force visits Clark Air Base and pays tribute to the "Ash Warriors", personnel who had remained throughout the volcanic activity and cleanup.
26 November 1991 American flag lowered for the last time by the Ash Warriors; Clark Air Base turned over to the Philippines, ending over 90 years of U.S. presence.

See also 
 List of largest volcanic eruptions
 List of mass evacuations
 List of natural disasters by death toll

References 

Evacuations
History of Pampanga
History of Zambales
United States Marine Corps in the 20th century
United States military in the Philippines
Fiery Vigil